Kinder House and Ewelme Cottage are two historic houses on Ayr Street, in the suburb of Parnell, Auckland, New Zealand.

Because of claimed hauntings, the homes were visited by a team of paranormal investigators in 2005 and featured on Ghost Hunt, a New Zealand television show.

Kinder House 
Location: 

Kinder House, sometimes known as "The Headmaster's House" was built in 1857, commissioned by Bishop George Selwyn and designed by Frederick Thatcher, architect of many Anglican buildings in Auckland. The house is a Gothic-style, double-storey mansion built of grey volcanic stone quarried from nearby Mount Eden.

The house was the residence of London-born John Kinder, a teacher, painter, photographer and reverend of the  Church of England Grammar School, Parnell. He occupied the house with his wife and the six children of his brother Henry Kinder, who was murdered by John's sister-in-law and her lover.

The house was opened to the public as a gallery in 1982. The house is also used for wedding receptions and other functions. In 2012, leading landscape photographers from New Zealand and abroad exhibited New Zealand landscape photography at a Kinder House exhibition organized by the Contemporary Photography Foundation, during the Auckland Festival of Photography.

It is claimed that the house is haunted by the apparition of a man.

Ewelme Cottage  
Location: 

Ewelme Cottage is named after the church of the same name. It was built mostly of kauri in 1863 and 1864 for Church of England clergyman Reverend Vicesimus Lush and family while he was vicar of All Saints Church, Howick. This was so that his sons could attend the Church of England Grammar School in Parnell. The cottage was continuously occupied by the Lush family, among them Mary Ruddock, until 1968. Since 1969, it has been preserved as a house museum by the New Zealand Historic Places Trust as the Lush family had left it, with about 2,000 books, hundreds of pages of sheet music, original artworks and a vast array of everyday objects from their time period. In an article published in The New Zealand Herald in 2011, Ewelme Cottage was suggested as possibly the most important of the Auckland's Historic Places Trust properties, despite being the smallest.

The drawing room, veranda and garden of Ewelme Cottage were used in the production of the 1993 Oscar-winning film The Piano.

Regarded as one of the most haunted places in the city, it is claimed to be haunted by spirits of women and children. The house is reputedly haunted in particular by a young girl who has reportedly appeared by an oak tree in the garden. A local clairvoyant claimed that this ghost may be the spirit of a young female who was insane. According to a curator of the historic home, sightings of ghosts at Ewelme Cottage date back to 1945. In 2020, Ewelme Cottage offered free entry for Waitangi Day.

References

External links 
 Kinder House Official Website

Reportedly haunted locations in New Zealand
Historic house museums in New Zealand
Museums in Auckland
Houses completed in 1857
Houses completed in 1864
Heritage New Zealand Category 1 historic places in the Auckland Region
1860s architecture in New Zealand
1857 establishments in New Zealand
Kinder House
Historic homes in New Zealand
Parnell, New Zealand